This Is Fats is a 1959 studio album by American rock and roll pianist Fats Domino, released on Imperial Records.

Reception
A contemporary review in Billboard highlighted how many hits the album had and its strong New Orleans sound. The New Rolling Stone Album Guide scores this release alongside all of Domino's Imperial albums as 4.5 out of five stars. The editorial staff of AllMusic Guide scored this album 3.5 out of five stars, with reviewer Stephen Thomas Erlewine characterizing it as a "terrifically entertaining listen" and summing up his review "maybe it's not the best Fats Domino album ever, but as it's playing it's hard to imagine listening to anything better than this".

Track listing
All songs written by Dave Bartholomew and Fats Domino, except where noted.

Side one:
"You Left Me" – 2:02
"Ain't It Good" – 2:38
"Howdy Podner" – 2:09
"Stack & Billy" – 2:00
"Would You" (Victor A. Augustine, Domino, and Pearl King) – 1:58
"Margie" (Con Conrad and J. Russel Robinson) – 2:15
Side one Vinyl Lovers re-release bonus track:
"You Done Me Wrong" (Domino) – 2:10
Side two:
"Hands Across the Table" (Jean Delettre and Mitchell Parish) – 1:57
"When the Saints Go Marching In" (traditional, arrangement by Bartholomew and Domino) – 2:23
"Ida Jane" (Domino) – 2:14
"Lil' Liza Jane" (Countess Ada de Lachau, with new lyrics by Bartholomew and Domino) – 1:51
"I'm Gonna Be a Wheel Some Day" (Bartholomew, Domino, and Roy Hayes) – 2:02
"I Want to Talk You Home" (Domino) – 2:15
Side two Vinyl Lovers re-release bonus track:
"So Long" – 2:10

Personnel
Adapted from the liner notes from the Vinyl Lovers re-release:
Fats Domino – vocals and piano, except on "I'm Gonna Be a Wheel Some Day" (vocals only)
"You Left Me" (recorded in New Orleans, Louisiana, between June and December 1953)
Cornelius Coleman – drums
Billy Diamond – bass guitar
Wendell Duconge – alto saxophone
Robert “Buddy” Hagans – tenor saxophone
Walter "Papoose" Nelson – guitar
"Ain't It Good" (recorded in New Orleans, Louisiana, between June and December 1953)
Lee Allen – tenor saxophone
Cornelius Coleman – drums
Billy Diamond – bass guitar
Wendell Duconge – alto saxophone
Walter "Papoose" Nelson – guitar
"Howdy Podner" (recorded at Cosimo Recording Studio, New Orleans, Louisiana, between October and November 1955)
Lee Allen or Herb Hardesty or Buddy Hagans – tenor saxophone
Cornelius Coleman – drums
Frank Fields – bass guitar
Clarence Ford – alto saxophone
Ernest McLean – guitar
"Stack & Billy" (recorded at Cosimo Recording Studio, New Orleans, Louisiana, 1957)
Lee Allen or Clarence Ford or Herb Hardesty – tenor saxophone
Cornelius Coleman – drums
Frank Fields – bass guitar
Ernest McLean – guitar
"Would You" (recorded at Cosimo Recording Studio, New Orleans, Louisiana, 1957)
Lee Allen or Herb Hardesty – tenor saxophone
Frank Fields – bass guitar
Walter "Papoose" Nelson – guitar
Earl Palmer – drums
"Margie" (recorded at Cosimo Recording Studio, New Orleans, Louisiana, September 1958)
Red Callender or Jimmie Davis – bass guitar
Cornelius Coleman – drums
Wendell Duconge – alto saxophone
Clarence Ford – baritone saxophone
Herb Hardesty – tenor saxophone
Plas Johnson – tenor saxophone
Walter "Papoose" Nelson – guitar
"You Done Me Wrong" (recorded in New Orleans, Louisiana, between June and December 1953)
Lee Allen – tenor saxophone
Cornelius Coleman – drums
Frank Fields – bass guitar
Robert “Buddy” Hagans – tenor saxophone
Walter "Papoose" Nelson – guitar
"Hands Across the Table" (recorded in Los Angeles, California, October 1958)
Red Callender or Jimmie Davis – bass guitar
Cornelius Coleman – drums
Herb Hardesty – tenor saxophone
Plas Johnson – baritone saxophone
Walter "Papoose" Nelson – guitar
"When the Saints Go Marching In" (recorded at Cosimo Recording Studio, New Orleans, Louisiana, between June and November 1958)
Cornelius Coleman or Earl Palmer – drums
Jimmie Davis – bass guitar
Wendell Duconge – alto saxophone
Clarence Ford – tenor saxophone
Herb Hardesty – tenor saxophone
Plas Johnson – baritone saxophone
Ernest McLean – guitar
Allen Toussaint – piano
"Lil' Liza Jane" (recorded at Cosimo Recording Studio, New Orleans, Louisiana, between June and November 1958)
Cornelius Coleman or Earl Palmer – drums
Jimmie Davis – bass guitar
Wendell Duconge – alto saxophone
Clarence Ford – tenor saxophone
Herb Hardesty – tenor saxophone
Plas Johnson – baritone saxophone
Ernest McLean – guitar
"I'm Gonna Be a Wheel Some Day" (recorded at Cosimo Recording Studio, New Orleans, Louisiana, between June and November 1958)
Cornelius Coleman or Earl Palmer – drums
Jimmie Davis – bass guitar
Wendell Duconge – alto saxophone
Clarence Ford – tenor saxophone
Herb Hardesty – tenor saxophone
Plas Johnson – baritone saxophone
Ernest McLean – guitar
"Ida Jane" (recorded at Cosimo Recording Studio, New Orleans, Louisiana, May 25, 1956)
Justin Adams – guitar
Lee Allen – tenor saxophone
Dave Bartholomew – trumpet
Herb Hardesty – tenor saxophone
Frank Fields – bass guitar
Ernest McLean – guitar
Charles Williams – drums
"I Want to Talk You Home" (recorded at Cosimo Recording Studio, New Orleans, Louisiana, June 18, 1958)
Cornelius Coleman – drums
Jimmie Davis – bass guitar
Clarence Ford – saxophone
Buddy Hagans – saxophone
Roy Montrell or Walter "Papoose" Nelson – guitar
"So Long" (recorded at Cosimo Recording Studio, New Orleans, Louisiana, between October and November 1955)
Lee Allen or Herb Hardesty or Buddy Hagans – tenor saxophone
Cornelius Coleman – drums
Frank Fields – bass guitar
Clarence Ford – alto saxophone
Ernest McLean – guitar

References

External links

1959 albums
Fats Domino albums
Imperial Records albums